Primeiro Comando da Capital (PCC;  "First Command of the Capital", 1533) is, according to a 2012 Brazilian Government  report, the largest Brazilian criminal organization, with a membership of almost 20,000 members, 6,000 of whom are in prison.

The criminal organization is based largely in the state of São Paulo and is active in at least 22 of the country's 27 states, as well as in Peru, Venezuela, Ecuador, Paraguay, Bolivia and United States Since its inception, PCC has been responsible for several criminal activities such as murders, prison breaks, prison riots, drug trafficking, bank robberies, highway robberies, protection rackets, pimping, kidnappings-for-ransom, money laundering, bribery, coercion, narco-terrorism, and obstruction of justice. The name refers to the state capital, city of São Paulo.

In 2012, a wave of violence in São Paulo killed upwards of 100 people including many police officers allegedly following the breakdown of an informal truce between the gang and the police.

History

The PCC was founded on August 31, 1993, by eight prisoners at Taubaté Penitentiary, called Piranhão (Big Piranha) in the state of São Paulo. At the time, this was considered the safest jail in the state.

The group initially got together during a football game. The prisoners had been transferred from the city of São Paulo to the Piranhão as punishment for bad behavior, and they decided to name their team the Capital Command—a name which would stick, as the game was followed by the brutal killing and decapitation of both the deputy director and a prisoner with special privileges, with the head of the latter being put on a stake.

The initial members were Misael "Misa" Aparecido da Silva, Wander Eduardo "Cara Gorda" (Fat Face) Ferreira, Antônio Carlos Roberto da Paixão, Isaías "Esquisito" (Weird) Moreira do Nascimento, Ademar "Dafé" dos Santos, Antônio "Bicho Feio" (Ugly Beast) Carlos dos Santos, César "Césinha" (Little César) Augusto Roris da Silva and José "Geleião" (Big Jelly) Márcio Felício.

PCC, which was also formerly referred to as the Party of Crime, and as 15.3.3 (following the order of the letters "P" and "C" in the former Brazilian alphabet, which did not contain the letter "K"), was founded with a clear agenda, aiming to "fight the oppression inside the São Paulo penitentiary system" and to "avenge the death of 111 prisoners," victims of the October 2, 1992 Carandiru massacre, when the São Paulo State Military Police stormed the now-defunct Casa de Detenção and killed the prisoners from the 9th pavilion in the process.

The group made use of the Chinese taititu ("yin yang") symbol as their emblem, saying it represented "a way to balance good and evil with wisdom." In February 2001, Idemir "Sombra" (Shadow) Carlos Ambrósio became the most prominent leader of the organization when he coordinated, by cell phone, simultaneous rebellions in 29 São Paulo state prisons, in which 16 prisoners were killed. "Sombra," also referred to as "father," was beaten to death on the Piranhão five months later by five members of the criminal faction in an internal struggle for the general command of the PCC. The PCC was led by "Geleião" and "Cesinha," responsible for the alliance with another criminal organization, Rio de Janeiro's Comando Vermelho. Following the alliance with Comando Vermelho, the gang adopted Vermelho's far-left beliefs and began advocating for revolution and the destruction of Brazil's capitalist system.  

Geleião and Cesinha, from the Bangu Penitentiary where they were held, went on to coordinate violent attacks against public buildings. Considered radicals by another moderate current of the PCC, they used terrorism to intimidate authorities of the prison system and were withdrawn from leadership in November 2002, when the leadership was taken by the current leader of the organization Marcos "Marcola" Willians Herbas Camacho. After he took over, the organization put a death bounty on Geleião and Cesinha, on the counts of having testified to the police and creating the Terceiro Comando da Capital (Third Capital Command, TCC).

Under the leadership of Marcola, also known as "Playboy," currently detained for bank robbery, the PCC took part in the March 2003 murder of Judge Antônio José Machado Dias, who ran the Penitentiary Readaptation Center (CRP) from Presidente Bernardes, São Paulo, currently Brazil's most strict supermax-style prison. The PCC also announced its objective to use prison uprisings as a way to demoralize the government and to destroy the CRP.

The organization is partly funded by its members, called "brothers." They are required to pay a monthly fee of R$50.00 (about US $12.90) while in prison, or R$500.00 (about US $129.00) if they are outside of it. The money is used to buy weapons and drugs, and also to finance operations to bail out prisoners connected to the organization. In order to become a member of the PCC, the prospective member needs to be formally introduced by another regular member, taking an oath to follow its 16-clause statute.

2006 attacks

Since the beginning of Friday May 12, 2006 there have been 299 attacks against public establishments such as police stations, justice forums, buses, etc.; which are allegedly organized by the PCC. The violence represents the bloodiest assault of its kind in the history of Brazil's richest state, São Paulo. The attacks have apparently been organized by gang members in prison via cell phone.

2012 attacks

By the end of 2012, another wave of attacks against the police began. The cause was apparently an announcement made by PCC leaders and spread to gang members outside jail. According to the message, called "Salve Geral", the organization was suffering losses allegedly caused by the killing of gang members by the São Paulo State police, and thereby, for each member killed by the police, one officer of the same corporation that caused it had to be murdered.

Then, during about thirty days, every day one or two policemen were killed, mostly in defenseless circumstances, such as resting, on vacation, or even retired officers. Many policemen were murdered in front of family or friends, usually when arriving or leaving their homes. After the crime, co-workers of the victim went to the neighborhood's drug hotspots, shooting suspicious people there in order to avenge their dead colleague. During those days, the city usually woke up with near a dozen casualties the night before.

By December, the killings started to decrease and ceased with no known reason.

2013 activity

Even though no more attacks have happened, police reports point out that behind the scenes PCC is getting stronger and bigger. They are already operating in almost every Brazilian State, and commanding minor gangs in those places. International activity, in other countries of South America, is also taking place. The reports also show that other uprisings were planned, but taken down by the State police. They also plan on running elections for the Congress, and have planned attacks to the Governor of the State of São Paulo, Geraldo Alckmin, who's been working hard to dismantle the gang.

Reports by the end of 2013 show that PCC's influence has reached Rio de Janeiro and they have taken control of the factions that command the city's drug market. The factions Comando Vermelho (Red Command), Amigos dos Amigos (Friends of the Friends) and Terceiro Comando (Third Command) are now ruled by PCC, whose order has been to stop fights between the factions, and increase the crack market, as that drug's selling was not well seen by Rio's gangs.

Paraguay heist 

In April 2017 the company Prosegur located in Ciudad del Este, in the Triple Frontier of Brazil, Argentina and Paraguay, was robbed by a group of at least 30 men carrying heavy firepower. 8 million dollars were stolen, differing from the early reports of 40 million. The group used automatic rifles, infrared sights, anti-aircraft guns, explosives, bullet proof getaway cars, speedboats and blocked avenues with torched cars and trucks, locals described the heist as "movie-like". 
Since the Modus operandi was similar to others used in past robberies in Campinas, Ribeirão Preto and Santos in 2015 and 2016, the PCC was the main suspect of perpetrating the heist, although never confirmed. It was the biggest robbery in the history of Paraguay. A police officer was killed and 4 people were injured.

Statute 

The Primeiro Comando da Capital has a statute with various rules for the criminal organization. Disobeying the rules, says the statute, carries a penalty of death.
On May 16, 2006 a couple was arrested with a copy of the statute.

Notable leaders and members
 Marco Willians Herbas Camacho, a.k.a. "Marcola (Incarcerated) 
 Alejandro Juvenal Herbas Camacho Júnior, a.k.a. "Marcolinha"/Little Marcola (Incarcerated)
 César Augusto Roriz Silva, a.k.a. "Cesinha"/Little Caesar (Deceased) 
 Reinaldo Teixeira dos Santos, a.k.a. "Funchal" (Incarcerated)
 Júlio César Guedes de Moraes, a.k.a. Carambola/Star Friit (Incarcerated)
 Daniel Vinícius Canônico, a.k.a. "O Cego"/The Blind One (Incarcerated)
 Márcio Luciano Neves Soares, a.k.a. "Pezão"/The Bigfoot (Incarcerated)
 Alessandro Garcia de Jesus Rosa, a.k.a. "Pulft" (Incarcerated)
 Lourinaldo Gomes Flor,  a.k.a. "Lori" (Incarcerated)
 Antônio José Muller Júnior, a.k.a. "Granada"/The Grenade (Incarcerated)
 Lucival de Jesus Feitoza, a.k.a. "Val do Bristol" (Incarcerated)
 Patric Velinton Salomão, a.k.a. "Forjado"/The Forged (Incarcerated)
 Fernando Gonçalves dos Santos, a.k.a.  "Colorido"/The Colorful (Incarcerated)
 Pedro Luiz da Silva Soares, a.k.a. "Chacal"/The Jackal (Incarcerated)
 Luiz Eduardo Marcondes Machado de Barros, a.k.a.  "Dú da Bela Vista" (Incarcerated)
 Alexandre Cardozo da Silva, a.k.a.  "Bradok"/Braddock (Incarcerated)
 André Macedo Oliveira, a.k.a. "André do Rap" (Fugitive)
 Gilberto Aparecido dos Santos, a.k.a. "Fuminho" (Incarcerated)
  Idemir Carlos Ambrósio, a.k.a. "Sombra"/The Shadow (Deceased)
 Marcos Roberto de Almeida, a.k.a. "Tuta" (Fugitive)
 Rogério Jeremias de Simone, a.k.a. "Gegê do Mangue" (Deceased)
 Fabiano Alves de Souza, a.k.a. "Paca" (Deceased)
 Wagner Ferreira da Silva, a.k.a. "Cabelo Duro"/Frizzy Hair (Deceased)
 Marcio Vinicius da Paixão Vieira, a.k.a. "Pica-Pau"/The Woodpecker (Incarcerated)

Notes

Alliance with 'Ndrangheta

According to investigations carried out by both Europol and the Brazilian Federal Police, the PCC has ties to the 'Ndrangheta, considered the most bloodthirsty group of the Italian Mafia and the richest and most powerful criminal syndicate in the West.

This was evident after the arrests of high-ranking 'Ndrangheta bosses and members in Brazil, such as Rocco Morabito (known as the “Cocaine King of Milan”), cousin of Giuseppe Morabito (one of the most powerful 'Ndrangheta bosses) and considered one of the organization's main drug traffickers.

According to investigations, Morabito is considered one of the main associates of André Macedo Oliveira (known as "André do Rap"), one of the current leaders of the PCC and considered one of the most bloodthirsty drug lords in Latin America.

Corruption case involving the PT government
Recently on July 1 of 2022, through the statements of Marcos Valério, sentenced to 37 years in prison for bribing legislators during the government of Lula Da Silva, he has claimed to have evidence that would confirm an alleged network of illegal financing, between the former president's party and the criminal organization "First Command of the Capital" ("PCC" for its acronym in Portuguese), as quoted by the magazine Veja and CNN Brasil. According to his confession, businessman Ronan Maria Pinto would be blackmailing then President Lula da Silva. He threatened to reveal that the PT was financed with illegal funds. The person who informed Valério of what happened was allegedly Sílvio Pereira, then general secretary of the PT. The business would be based on money laundering for the sale of illegal lottery, which would later be used as a means of financing for the Workers' Party.

The case gained notoriety on social networks, which caused many derogatory comments against Lula and the PT. In this regard, the judge of the Supreme Court Alexandre de Moraes issued a fine of up to 10,000 reais to those who post the news on social networks, according to the resolution "sensationalism and the senseless dissemination of false content" can "compromise the fairness of the process electoral, harming constitutionally guaranteed values, principles and guarantees”, referring to the right to vote and misinformation. This has generated criticism from both individuals and the national and international media, due to the violation of freedom of expression that the sentence represents. In this regard, the judge said “freedom of expression, in its positive aspect, allows for later civil and criminal liability for the content disseminated, in addition to the provision of the right of reply.”

See also

Polícia Militar
Criminal organization

Further reading 
 Karina Biondi, Sharing This Walk: An Ethnography of Prison Life and the PCC in Brazil.  Edited and translated by John F. Collins (Chapel Hill: University of North Carolina Press: 2016)

References

External links 
Map of the attack of May 2006 on São Paulo
Various pictures of the attack of May 2006

 
Organized crime groups in Brazil
Drug cartels
Prison gangs
Terrorism in Brazil
1993 establishments in Brazil
Organized crime groups in Bolivia
Organized crime groups in Venezuela
Organized crime groups in Portugal
Organized crime groups in the United States